Exmouth  is a port town, civil parish and seaside resort, sited on the east bank of the mouth of the River Exe and  southeast of Exeter.

In 2011 it had a population of 34,432, making Exmouth the 5th most populous settlement in Devon.

History
Byzantine coins with the mark of Anastasius I, dating back to c. 498–518, were retrieved from the beach in 1970. More recent human occupation of Exmouth Point can be traced back to the 11th century, when it was known as Lydwicnaesse, "the point of the Bretons".

The two ecclesiastical parishes, Littleham and Withycombe Raleigh, that make up the town of Exmouth today can be traced to pre-Saxon times. The name of the town derives from its location at the mouth of the River Exe estuary, which ultimately comes from an ancient Celtic word for fish. For centuries, the parishes were within East Budleigh Hundred.

In 1240 an area known as Pratteshuthe (Pratt’s landing place) was sold to the mayor and citizens of Exeter. This was the site of the estuary’s ferry dock and over time the name evolved first into Pratteshide, then Mona Island. The original site is marked by a seating area outside the Glenorchy United Reformed Church close to the Magnolia Shopping Centre.

For some centuries, commercial trade through the port was limited in part by the shallow waters on the approach to the quay, but mainly by the power of Exeter, which owned the dock and controlled all estuary traffic.  The roads in and out of the area were in a poor state and only occasionally repaired by the parishes through which they ran. A more permanent dock was built in 1825, replacing a series of apparently seasonal docks first noted on maps from 1576 as "The Docke". New docks designed by Eugenius Birch were opened in 1868, and a short line connected them to the railway goods yard. The area adjacent to the docks once housed a thriving community of some 125 chalets built on the shoreline. These have been replaced by a residential marina complex known as Exmouth Quay.

Human habitation was restricted by the harsh exposed position on the estuary – civilisation took a hold in a greater and more permanent way in the more comfortable outer lying rural areas. The town began to develop in the 13th century. Morin Uppehille owned the land, granting part of it to John the Miller who in turn built a windmill, and earned his living on the exposed point, aided by the prevailing south-west winds. The windmill, the ferry dock and a small settlement of farms began to develop into  Exmouth.

Sir Walter Raleigh (born 1544) sailed on many of his voyages from Exmouth Harbour.

In the mid 17th century the area suffered from the ravages of "Turkish pirates" (actually Algerian rovers), who raided the Devon and Cornwall coastlines, attacking shipping and attempting to capture sailors and villagers for sale as slaves in North Africa.

The town established itself during the 18th century and is regarded as the oldest holiday resort in Devon. Visitors prevented from visiting Europe by the revolutionary turmoil in France were attracted by the views and medicinal salt waters which were then fashionable. Exmouth was renowned as a destination for the wealthy to recover their health.  Notable visitors in this time included Lady Byron and her daughter Ada Lovelace. Exmouth was also the residence of Lady Nelson, the estranged wife of Lord Nelson. She is buried in Littleham Churchyard.

High class tourism remained steady for a number of years. This changed when the first railway line into Exmouth was built in 1861, bringing with it mass tourism. It is from this "golden age" for Exmouth that the present form of the town can be traced.

Architecture
Exmouth has a wide range of architecture, ranging from small cob cottages in parts of the town that were once villages and are now incorporated into it, such as Withycombe, to the Georgian, Victorian and Edwardian town houses.  The seafront has a traditional promenade. High above the promenade is the Beacon terrace, which first became fashionable in Georgian times.

The majority of buildings in Exmouth were constructed during the Victorian era with the arrival of the railway.  The area to the west of Exeter Road is land that was reclaimed by the railway, Exeter Road originally being part of the seafront.  Some houses near to the station in Littleham were constructed for the workers on the railway.

Demography and economy
In addition to its substantial summer tourist trade, Exmouth serves as a regional centre for leisure industries, particularly water sports such as sailing, kite sailing, paddleboarding, jet-skiing, and wind-surfing, and outdoor activities such as bird-watching, cycling and walking.  The Exe Estuary is a Site of Special Scientific Interest and is noted in particular for its wading and migrating birds.  A large part of the estuary lies within a nature reserve.  Exmouth marks the western end of the Jurassic Coast World Heritage Site, which stretches eastwards along the coast to Poole, in Dorset; the South West Coast Path allows for walking along this coast. The town is also at the western end of the East Devon Way path that leads to Lyme Regis.

Education

The town has 8 primary schools and one secondary school.

Primary schools:
Bassett's Farm Primary School
Brixington Primary School
Exeter Road Community Primary School
Littleham Church of England Primary School
Marpool Primary School
St Joseph's Catholic Primary School
The Beacon CofE (VA) Primary School
Withycombe Raleigh Church of England Primary School

Secondary school:
Exmouth Community College

In 2013, Exmouth Community College (formerly Exmouth School) had 2,615 pupils, aged 11 to 18.

Rolle College was opened in 1946 and later became the Exmouth campus of the University of Plymouth. In 2008 the University of Plymouth decided to close the College. East Devon MP Hugo Swire discussed the College's closure in Parliament. 

In 2016 the Exeter Royal Academy for Deaf Education bought the Rolle College site and began developing it into a state-of-the-art Deaf Education centre. In 2020, newly re-branded as the Deaf Academy, the school completed the move from Exeter to Exmouth.

Geography

The town is defined by the sea and river frontages (each about a mile long), and stretches around 2.5 miles (4 km) inland, along a north-easterly axis.  The docks lie at the western corner of this rectangle, where the river passes through a narrow passage into the sea, the mouth of the estuary being nearly closed by Dawlish Warren on the opposite shore of the river. Dawlish Warren is a natural sand spit and is home to rare wildlife and plants, part of which is a nature reserve and restricted access. The sea frontage forms a sandy two mile long beach; at its eastern end, the town is limited by the cliffs of the High Land of Orcombe, a National Trust-owned open space which rises to a peak at Orcombe Point.

Geologically, the low hill known as "The Beacon", in the centre of the present town, is formed of breccias that are an outcrop of a similar formation on the west side of the Exe estuary.  The rising land on which the town has grown is formed of New Red Sandstone.  This solid land is surrounded by mudflats and sandspits, some of which have been stabilised and now form part of the  land on which the town is built, and some of which remain as tidal features in the estuary and off the coast. The outflow from the river flows eastwards, parallel to the beach for some distance, limited by sandbanks that are exposed at low tide. Many of the buildings on the reclaimed land are fitted with pumps to extract water from their basements during high tide.

Government
Administratively Exmouth lies within the East Devon district, along with neighbouring coastal towns east of the Exe. It has its own town council, presided over by a mayor elected from amongst the councillors. There are five wards each electing five town councillors thus 25 town councillors in all. Councillors are volunteers for which they receive no remuneration. The town clerk is the council's senior paid officer with eight part-time staff.   The town supports Exmouth Town Team, Tourism Team and Arts Forum and employs a Town Management Officer with the role of supporting the economy of the town working with businesses and promoting the town. The total population of the five wards mentioned is 34,442 meaning that one or more must spread outside the town's boundary.

Landmarks

The 16-sided 18th century house called A La Ronde, now in the ownership of the National Trust, lies on the northern outskirts of the town. At the eastern end of Exmouth is the Barn, a late 19th century house in Arts and Crafts style.

The National Coastwatch Institution Tower on the seafront has been a familiar feature of the Exmouth beach skyline in family photos and postcards for over 100 years. The red brick building was completed and opened in 1896 as a race observation tower for the then Exmouth Yacht Club, offering enviable views on race days along the beach and toward the estuary mouth. Since then it has changed hands over the course of the 20th century and had many and varied uses including a bathing house, a private home and in 1935 it became a convalescent home as a part of the Princess Elizabeth Orthopaedic Hospital. It was requisitioned in the 40’s and served as a part of the war effort as a defence lookout station watching over our coastline and in peacetime it was reopened as the Harbour View Café (summer 1946) as which it has been trading ever since. Its lookout days did not end during the war however, since 1998 it has been staffed by the National Coastwatch Institute volunteers, keeping an eye on our coast alongside the Coastguard and RNLI. As one of over 50 stations around the UK coast they act as eyes and ears, monitoring the coastline and radio channels on alert for anyone in difficulty and any hazards in the waters.

Lifeboats

Exmouth's first lifeboat was provided in 1803. A boathouse was built near Passage House but was washed away in a storm in 1814. The Royal National Lifeboat Institution revived the lifeboat station in 1858. A new boathouse was built near the beach, although the lifeboat had to be taken across the road before it could be launched. This boathouse was demolished and a new one built on the same site in 1903 to accommodate a larger lifeboat. From 1961 the lifeboat was kept afloat in the river near the entrance to Exmouth Docks. A boarding boat was kept on a davit that was lowered into the water to ferry the crew to the lifeboat. The old lifeboat station by the beach was retained as a fund-raising display centre and, from 1966, was the base for an inshore lifeboat. The building used by crews at the docks was demolished in 1996 and replaced by temporary portable buildings. 

On 21 November 2009 both lifeboats were transferred to a new lifeboat station on Queen's Drive at the eastern end of the beach. Within the building is a sign from the now-demolished Volunteer Inn once run by Will Carder. On Christmas Day 1956 he was swept overboard and drowned during a mission on the Maria Noble to save the crew of the Dutch ship MV Minerva 4 miles south east of Orcombe Point. It is regarded as the worst tragedy in the history of Exmouth RNLI.

From this station the Royal National Lifeboat Institution operates a Shannon Class All Weather Lifeboat (ALB) R and J Welburn (previously a  All Weather Lifeboat (ALB) named Margaret Jean) and  Inshore Lifeboat (ILB) named George Bearman. The latter was replaced in 2017 by the D-Class Inshore Lifeboat George Bearman II.

The old boathouse was retained as a base for the RNLI lifeguards until 2014, when it became the headquarters of the Exmouth Rowing Club.

Regeneration
, £3 million has been spent on the regeneration of the Strand, which has seen the removal of much of the grass, flower beds and many of the trees. The new features include an additional seating area and bicycle storage; the area has also been completely pedestrianised. The Strand was partially open for Remembrance Sunday 2010 with the war memorial area complete.

Religion
Exmouth has a number of active churches. About Holy Trinity Church, a parish of the Church of England, an 1850 reference work says this:

The Church [Holy Trinity] is a chapel of ease under the parish church of Littleham, and was erected by the late Lord Rolle, at the cost of £13,000 in 1824-25. It is a handsome structure, in the perpendicular style, standing on the Beacon hill, and having a tower 104 feet high, containing a clock and one bell. The whole length of the building is 140 feet, and its breadth 84. The interior is handsomely fitted up, and has sittings for 1,500 hearers. It has a fine toned organ, and over the altar table is a fine canopy of Beer stone, in the florid Gothic style, ornamented with crockets, pinnacles, & c. The curacy has a small endowment, given by the noble founder and is annexed to the vicarage of Littleham. Until the erection of this church, Exmouth was without an episcopal place of worship; for though a small ancient chapel, dedicated to the Holy Trinity, was standing in 1412, all traces of it disappeared some centuries ago.

Other active churches include Christ Church Exmouth, Hope Church, Glenorchy United Reformed Church, Tower Street Methodist Church, Ichthus Community Church, Holy Ghost Roman Catholic Church, Exmouth Baptist Church, and Exmouth Salvation Army.

Sport
Exmouth Town F.C. is the leading football team in the town, and play in the Western League. Exmouth has two rugby union teams, Exmouth RFC and Withycombe RFC. East Devon Eagles rugby league team were based in Exmouth and played until 2011 in the South West Division of the Rugby League Conference. Exmouth is also home to the Polesanders Beach Rugby Club who were established in 2014. Devon County Cricket Club play their Minor Counties Championship matches at the Maer Ground. Exmouth also has a large indoor leisure centre.

Transport
Exmouth railway station is the terminus of the Avocet Line to Exeter St David's station although the trains run through to Paignton and Barnstaple alternately through the day.  A cycleway has been built alongside the railway as far as Exeter and beyond. The Exmouth to Starcross Ferry is a passenger ferry that operates during the summer months across the Exe estuary to Starcross, where the pumping station for Brunel's Atmospheric Railway can be seen.

There have been three railway stations at Exmouth. The line first reached Exmouth from Exeter in 1861. In the first five days 10,000 people travelled on the line and property prices increased overnight. By the 1880s commuter traffic to Exeter was considerable.  In 1903 a link to Budleigh Salterton was opened the line going eastward over a viaduct which went from Exeter Road to Park Road where it entered a cutting continuing onto Littleham Cross where there was also a station (now a private residence), and from there to Budleigh Salterton, there turning north to rejoin the main London and South Western Railway line.  Exmouth Station was rebuilt in 1926. When the line to Budleigh was lifted the viaduct was left in place for many years, with its final destruction in the late 1980s.  Housing marks its position now.

The route of the line continued behind Phear Park, which was once the grounds of a large house belonging to the Phear family, used during the Second World War to station US soldiers.  Shortly after the war the house was burnt down and left derelict; eventually it too was demolished, and its grounds were given to the town by the Phear family to become a park.  The old railway line behind Phear Park was just left as a bare trackbed for many years.  At its far end there was a deep cutting to Littleham, which was filled in when the line was closed.  The trackbed has now been tarmacked and now forms an off-road cycle way and footpath from Exmouth to Knowle, close to Budleigh Salterton.

The latest station was built in 1981 beside the bus station and is a single platform station.  It also has a pay and display car park for rail users.

Stagecoach South West operate several, frequent bus services in and around the town, including the 57 Stagecoach Gold service to Brixington in one direction, and Lympstone, Topsham, and Exeter in the other direction. This service runs every 15 minutes. Another popular Stagecoach service is the 95 summer service to Sandy Bay Holiday Park. This is usually operated by an open top bus, and runs every hour.

Notable people

Alex Wade, author
Antonio Corbisiero, (born 1984), footballer
Brian Sedgemore (born 1937), politician
Charles Gifford (born 1821), Canadian politician
Collett Leventhorpe (1815–1889), Confederate general
Conrad Humphreys (born 1973), sailor
Ed "Stewpot" Stewart (1941-2016), radio DJ and entertainer
Francis Danby (16 November 1793 – 9 February 1861) Irish born painter of the Romantic era.
Graham Hurley (born 1946), author  
Hugh Davies (1943–2005), composer (born in the town)
John Churchill, 1st Duke of Marlborough (1650–1722), military leader 
John Nutt (fl. 1620–1623), pirate
Pam St. Clement (born 1942), actress, (attended Rolle College)
Patricia Beer (1919–1999), poet 
Pauline Collins (born 1940), actor
Pearl Carr (born 1923), entertainer (born in the town)
Percy James Grigg (1890–1964), politician
Pete Lee-Wilson, actor 
Peter Knight (1917–1985), composer (born in the town)
R. F. Delderfield (1912–1972), author (moved to Exmouth in 1923 when his father purchased the "Exmouth Chronicle")
Rebecca Newman (born 1981) Singer-songwriter; her 2014 CD gained the No 1 position in the Classical Albums chart
Robert Dawson (born 1970), cricketer
Robin Bush (1943-2010), historian for the first nine series of Channel 4's archaeology series Time Team and author
Spud Rowsell (born 1944), sailor
William Francis de Vismes Kane (1840–1918), Irish entomologist
William Kyd (1430–1453), pirate
Xia Vigor (born 2009),  Filipina child actress

References

External links

Devon County Council: Exmouth community page
Exmouth - From White's Devonshire Directory of 1850 at genuki 
Exmouth Town Council Tourist Information Website

The National Coastwatch Tower - Mark Muir Architect

 
Towns in Devon
Seaside resorts in England
Beaches of Devon
Populated coastal places in Devon
Ports and harbours of Devon